The Rue Royale ("Royal Street") or Koningsstraat (Dutch, "King's Street") is a street in Brussels, Belgium, running through the municipalities of Schaerbeek, Saint-Josse-ten-Noode and the City of Brussels. It is limited to the south by the Place Royale/Koningsplein in the city centre and to the north by the / in Schaerbeek.

Several places of interest lie along the Rue Royale, for instance the Royal Palace, the Centre for Fine Arts, Brussels Park, the Congress Column, the Botanical Garden of Brussels, Le Botanique concert hall and Saint Mary's Royal Church. In addition, many companies have offices on the street, for instance Accenture and BNP Paribas Fortis as well as the French-speaking Community of Belgium.

Two metro stations can be accessed from the Rue Royale: Parc/Park metro station and Botanique/Kruidtuin metro station. The street is continued to the north by the / and to the south by the /. It also crosses the Small Ring (Brussels' inner ring road) at the / crossroad.

History
The Rue Royale was laid out in 1777 between the Place Royale/Koningsplein and the /, which required enormous levelling works. From 1822, the street was extended to the Schaerbeek Gate on the current Small Ring by the engineer Jean-Alexandre Werry and the architect Hendrik Partoes. Shortly afterwards, it was extended even further on the territory of Saint-Josse-ten-Noode to the newly constructed / in Schaerbeek, where Saint Mary's Royal Church closes the kilometre-long perspective.

In November 1902, King Leopold II was attacked by the Italian anarchist Gennaro Rubino on the Rue Royale and escaped death. However his Grand Marshall, Count Charles d'Oultremont, was almost killed.

Gallery

See also

 List of streets in Brussels
 Neoclassical architecture in Belgium
 History of Brussels
 Belgium in "the long nineteenth century"

References

Notes

Royale
City of Brussels
19th century in Brussels